Bargfeld-Stegen is a municipality in the district of Stormarn, in Schleswig-Holstein, Germany.

References

Stormarn (district)